Hovala pardalina is a butterfly in the family Hesperiidae. It is found in central, northern and north-eastern Madagascar. The habitat consists of forests.

References

Butterflies described in 1879
Heteropterinae
Butterflies of Africa
Taxa named by Arthur Gardiner Butler